Supercops, Super Cop, or variation, may refer to:

Film
Supercop, aka Police Story 3, a 1992 Hong Kong film
 Supercop (soundtrack), 1996 U.S. soundtrack album for the Hong Kong film
 "Supercop" (song), 1996 song by Devo off the eponymous soundtrack for the eponymous film, see Supercop (soundtrack)
Supercop 2, a 1993 Hong Kong follow-up to Supercop
The Super Cops, a 1974 American film directed by Gordon Parks
Crime Busters, a 1977 Italian film with alternative title of Two Supercops
Miami Supercops, a 1985 Italian film
RoboCop, a 1987 film, whose original working title was SuperCop
Yes Madam, a 1985 Hong Kong film with Super Cops as its European title

People
 James Simone (born 1948) nicknamed "Super Cop"; of the Cleveland Police
 William Bratton (born 1947) nicknamed "Supercop" by the British press; former NYCPD commissioner

Fictional characters
 Supercop, a motorcycle traffic cop from Scotch & Wry, portrayed by Rikki Fulton

Other uses
 "Supercops" (2010 TV episode) episode 18 of The Good Guys (2010 TV series)

See also

 
 
 
 
 Super (disambiguation)
 Cop (disambiguation)